Worrolong is a north-eastern suburb of Mount Gambier.

Most of the suburb is in the District Council of Grant. A small portion of the southwest including the Mount Gambier Golf Course is in the City of Mount Gambier. The eastern boundary includes a segment of the Glenelg Highway.

References

Towns in South Australia